XHENR-FM is a radio station on 89.1 FM in Nueva Rosita, Coahuila, Mexico. It is known as XENR (using its former AM call letters).

History
XENR-AM 980 received its concession on November 12, 1953. It was authorized to operate at 5,000 watts daytime by the 1960s and has been owned by Daniel Boone Menchaca since the start.

References

Radio stations in Coahuila